Christine Lorraine Gosden (born 17 November 1939), also known by her married name Christine Parfect, is a female retired British swimmer.

Swimming career
Gosden competed in the 200-metre breaststroke event at the 1956 and 1960 Summer Olympics and finished eighth in 1956.

She won a gold medal representing England with a world record time in the 4×110-yard medley relay at the 1958 British Empire and Commonwealth Games in Cardiff, Wales  in addition to taking an individual silver in the 220 yards breaststroke event.

She also won a bronze medal in the 4×100-metre medley relay at the 1958 European Aquatics Championships At the ASA National British Championships she won the 220 yards breaststroke title and the 110 yards butterfly title in 1957.

References

External links

1939 births
Living people
Swimmers at the 1956 Summer Olympics
Swimmers at the 1960 Summer Olympics
Olympic swimmers of Great Britain
English female swimmers
European Aquatics Championships medalists in swimming
Commonwealth Games medallists in swimming
Commonwealth Games gold medallists for England
Commonwealth Games bronze medallists for England
Universiade medalists in swimming
Swimmers at the 1958 British Empire and Commonwealth Games
Universiade gold medalists for Great Britain
Universiade silver medalists for Great Britain
Medalists at the 1959 Summer Universiade
Medalists at the 1961 Summer Universiade
Medallists at the 1958 British Empire and Commonwealth Games